Josei (女性) is a Japanese word for "woman". It may also refer to:

 Josei manga, a genre of manga
 Josei Jishin, a Japanese weekly women's magazine
 Jōsei Toda (1900–1958), second president of Soka Gakkai
 Josei Shonan, a fictional character in the manga series The Prince of Tennis